Väinö Veikko Salovaara (26 February 1888, Iitti – 29 October 1964), until 1906 Sillfors, was a Finnish chief engineer and politician. He served as Deputy Minister of Transport and Public Works from 12 March 1937 to 2 September 1939 and as Minister of Transport and Public Works from 2 September 1939 to 17 November 1944. He was a member of the Parliament of Finland from 1939 to 1945, representing the Social Democratic Party of Finland (SDP). He was the chairman of the SDP from 1942 to 1944.

References

1888 births
1964 deaths
People from Iitti
People from Uusimaa Province (Grand Duchy of Finland)
Leaders of the Social Democratic Party of Finland
Ministers of Transport and Public Works of Finland
Members of the Parliament of Finland (1939–45)
Finnish people of World War II